Luis Manuel Bernardo MBE was the chairman of the United Bermuda Party, and a member of the Marine and Air Board of Bermuda.

References 

United Bermuda Party politicians
Year of birth missing
Year of death missing
Members of the Order of the British Empire
Bermudian Members of the Order of the British Empire